"Rockestra Theme" is the fourth and final single on Wings' final studio album Back to the Egg.

Recording
"Rockestra Theme" was recorded on 3 October 1978 at Abbey Road Studios by an all-star collection of musicians dubbed "Rockestra", although the song is technically credited to Wings. It was recorded as part of Wings' 1979 album Back to the Egg and released as a single in France.

Personnel
Musicians who performed on both this song and on "So Glad To See You Here" included: Denny Laine, Laurence Juber, David Gilmour, Hank Marvin, Pete Townshend (guitars), Steve Holley, John Bonham, Kenney Jones (drums), Paul McCartney (piano, bass), John Paul Jones, Ronnie Lane, Bruce Thomas (basses), Gary Brooker, Linda McCartney, Tony Ashton (keyboards), Speedy Acquaye, Tony Carr, Ray Cooper, Morris Pert (percussion), Howie Casey, Tony Dorsey, Steve Howard, Thaddeus Richard (horns).

One person taken out of the Rockestra supergroup was Jeff Beck. After being asked by McCartney to participate, Beck requested to be able to have veto power over his own guitar contributions. McCartney subsequently withdrew Beck's invitation.

In a 2001 interview on VH1, McCartney said Keith Moon was to have taken part in "Rockestra" but died one month before the recording sessions took place. Kenney Jones, who replaced Moon on drums within The Who, appeared instead. Wings' drummer Steve Holley described the recording session as "daunting".

Personnel

Paul McCartney – vocals, bass, piano
Linda McCartney – keyboards, backing vocals
Denny Laine – electric guitar
Laurence Juber – electric guitar
Steve Holley – drums
David Gilmour – electric guitar
Pete Townshend – electric guitar
Hank Marvin – electric guitar
Tony Ashton – keyboards
Gary Brooker – piano
Bruce Thomas – bass
Ronnie Lane – bass
 John Paul Jones – bass, piano
John Bonham – drums
Kenney Jones – drums
Ray Cooper – percussion
 Tony Carr – percussion
Morris Pert – percussion
Howie Casey – horns
 Tony Dorsey – horns
 Steve Howard – horns
Thaddeus Richard – horns
Speedy Acquaye – percussion

Live
The song was performed again at the Concerts for the People of Kampuchea and released on the album and EP of the same name. This was a series of concerts featuring Queen, The Clash, the Pretenders, The Who, Elvis Costello, Wings, and many more artists which took place at the Hammersmith Odeon in London, England during December 1979 to raise money for the victims of war-torn Cambodia. The event was organized by McCartney and Kurt Waldheim, and it involved older artists such as McCartney and The Who as well as younger new wave acts like The Clash and the Pretenders. The last of the concerts was the last concert of Wings.

Most of the Rockestra wore silver suits for this performance. On the Concerts for Kampuchea home video, McCartney can be heard making a comment about Townshend before playing the song, making reference to Townshend being a "poof" (gay in British slang). "Thank you, Peter. Only lousy sod who wouldn't wear the silver suit. Cuz he's a poof." Townshend made comment about it in several interviews following the performance. Juber can be seen walking up behind Townshend after McCartney's comment, and placing a silver top hat on his head. Townshend quickly grabs the hat and flings it into the audience.

Aftermath
"Rockestra Theme" won the 1980 Grammy Award for Best Rock Instrumental Performance. In France it was used as the opening theme of Chlorophylle, a pop-rock program on the radio station Europe 1.

References

Paul McCartney songs
1979 singles
Paul McCartney and Wings songs
Songs written by Paul McCartney
All-star recordings
Charity singles
Parlophone singles
Song recordings produced by Paul McCartney
Grammy Award for Best Rock Instrumental Performance
Song recordings produced by Chris Thomas (record producer)
Music published by MPL Music Publishing
1978 songs